Heywood is a town in the Metropolitan Borough of Rochdale, Greater Manchester, England, and it is unparished.  The town and the surrounding countryside contain 18 listed buildings that are recorded in the National Heritage List for England.  Of these, two are listed at Grade II*, the middle grade, and the others are at Grade II, the lowest grade.  Until the coming of the Industrial Revolution the area was rural, and during the 19th century cotton mills were built.  The earliest listed buildings are a house and a farmhouse with farm buildings.  The later listed buildings include cotton mills and a chimney, churches and associated structures, a railway warehouse, a library, a house designed by Edgar Wood, and two war memorials.


Key

Buildings

References

Citations

Sources

Lists of listed buildings in Greater Manchester
Buildings and structures in the Metropolitan Borough of Rochdale
Listed